Michael Jovan "Juice" Thompson (born February 9, 1989) is an American professional basketball player who plays for Al Ahly.

Professional career
In June 2013, Thompson signed with Élan Béarnais Pau-Lacq-Orthez.

On July 24, 2014, he joined SPO Rouen.

On August 12, 2015, Thompson returned to Élan béarnais Pau-Lacq-Orthez. On 31 October 2015, Thompson scored 41 points in a game against SLUC Nancy. Thompson was named to the All-LNB Pro A Team of the 2015–16 season and was the league's top scorer.

On July 4, 2016, Thompson signed with Turkish club Beşiktaş.

On July 9, 2017, Thompson joined İstanbul BB.

On August 23, 2019, he has signed with BCM Gravelines-Dunkerque of the LNB Pro A. He averaged 9.9 points, 2.8 rebounds, and 5.7 assists per game. On August 10, 2020, Thompson signed with BC Astana of the Kazakhstan Championship and the VTB United League.

On September 9, 2021, Thompson signed with Egyptian club Al Ahly.

References

External links
Northwestern Wildcats bio
FIBA profile

1989 births
Living people
American expatriate basketball people in France
American expatriate basketball people in Germany
American expatriate basketball people in Turkey
American men's basketball players
ASVEL Basket players
Basketball players from Chicago
BC Astana players
Beşiktaş men's basketball players
Élan Béarnais players
İstanbul Büyükşehir Belediyespor basketball players
Le Mans Sarthe Basket players
Northwestern Wildcats men's basketball players
Point guards
Skyliners Frankfurt players